Marengo County is a county located in the west central portion of the U.S. state of Alabama. As of the 2020 census, the population was 19,323. The largest city is Demopolis, and the county seat is Linden. It is named in honor of the Battle of Marengo near Turin, Italy, where French leader Napoleon Bonaparte defeated the Austrians on June 14, 1800.

History
Marengo County was created by the Alabama Territorial legislature on February 6, 1818, from land acquired from the Choctaw by the Treaty of Fort St. Stephens on October 24, 1816. Like the other four of the "Five Civilized Tribes", over the course of the following twenty years the Choctaw were largely forced west of the Mississippi River and into what is now Oklahoma during the period of Indian Removal conducted by the federal government.

The county was named to commemorate Napoleon's victory at the Battle of Marengo over Austrian armies on June 14, 1800.  This name was chosen in honor of the first European settlers, Bonapartists exiled from France after Napoleon's downfall. In 1817 a number of French settled the area around Demopolis. They were trying to develop a Vine and Olive Colony. Other ethnic French who settled here were refugees from the colony of Saint-Domingue, where enslaved Africans and "free people of color" had routed Napoleon's troops and white colonists, and declared independence in 1804. They established the territory as Haiti, the second republic in the western hemisphere.

The county seat was originally known as the Town of Marengo, but in 1823 the name was changed to Linden. Linden is a shortened version of Hohenlinden, scene of the Battle of Hohenlinden, a French victory in Bavaria on December 3, 1800, during Napoleon's campaign. 

Situated in Alabama's Black Belt and having a naturally rich soil, the county was developed by planters for numerous cotton plantations, dependent on the forced labor of large gangs of enslaved African Americans.  The enslaved comprised the majority of the county population decades before the American Civil War. In 1860 the population consisted of 24,409 slaves, 6761 free whites (including 944 slave owners), and one "free person of color," for a total combined population of 31,171.  At this time there were 778 plantations and farms in the county.

The fourth-oldest Jewish congregation in Alabama, B'nai Jeshurun, was established in Demopolis in 1858 by immigrants and migrants from other Southern cities.  

After the Civil War, the economy continued to be based on agriculture. In the transition to free labor, many freedmen turned to sharecropping or tenant farming as a way to establish some independence. They did not want to work in white-controlled field gangs.

The county population began to diminish rapidly during and after World War II. People left the farms for manufacturing jobs elsewhere, particularly with the wartime buildup of the defense industry on the West Coast. The movement of African Americans out of Alabama and other parts of the South was considered part of the Great Migration, by which 5 million left the region from 1940 to 1970. In addition to seeking jobs, they sought better conditions than the disfranchisement and Jim Crow oppression they faced in Alabama and other states of the South.

Most of the former cotton fields were gradually converted to pastures for cattle and horses, developed into tree plantations for timber and paper production, or transformed into commercial ponds for farming grain-fed catfish.  Beginning in the 1960s, industry began to move into the area. The work force was employed in paper mills, lumber mills, and chemical plants.

County courthouse fires occurred in 1848 and 1965. Each time most of the court records were saved, as they were in a protected vault.

Geography

Marengo County is situated in the west-central area of the state.  
The entire western county border is formed by the Tombigbee River and a small northwestern portion is formed by the Black Warrior River.

Major highways
 U.S. Highway 43
 U.S. Highway 80
 State Route 5
 State Route 10
 State Route 25
 State Route 28
 State Route 69

Adjacent counties

Hale County (north)
Perry County (northeast)
Dallas County (east)
Wilcox County (southeast)
Clarke County (south)
Choctaw County (southwest)
Sumter County (northwest)
Greene County (north-northwest)

Demographics

2020 census

As of the 2020 United States Census, there were 19,323 people, 7,361 households, and 3,833 families residing in the county.

2010 census
As of the 2010 census, there were 21,027 people living in the county. 51.7% were Black or African American, 46.4% White, 0.3% Asian, 0.2% Native American, 0.1% Pacific Islander, 0.7% of some other race and 0.8% of two or more races. 1.7% were Hispanic or Latino (of any race).

2000 census
In 2000 there were 22,539 people, 8,767 households, and 6,277 families living in the county.  The population density was 23 people per square mile (9/km2).  There were 10,127 housing units at an average density of 10 per square mile (4/km2).  The racial makeup of the county was 51.71% Black or African American, 47.28% White, 0.08% Native American, 0.18% Asian, 0.01% Pacific Islander, 0.25% from other races, and 0.47% from two or more races.  0.97% of the population were Hispanic or Latino of any race.

There were 8,767 households, out of which 34.70% had children under the age of 18 living with them, 48.40% were married couples living together, 19.40% had a female householder with no husband present, and 28.40% were non-families. 26.50% of all households were made up of individuals, and 12.10% had someone living alone who was 65 years of age or older.  The average household size was 2.55 and the average family size was 3.08.

In the county, the population was spread out, with 28.50% under the age of 18, 8.00% from 18 to 24, 26.00% from 25 to 44, 22.90% from 45 to 64, and 14.60% who were 65 years of age or older.  The median age was 36 years. For every 100 females there were 88.30 males.  For every 100 females age 18 and over, there were 82.20 males.

The median income for a household in the county was $27,025, and the median income for a family was $35,475. Males had a median income of $36,053 versus $19,571 for females. The per capita income for the county was $15,308.  About 22.20% of families and 25.90% of the population were below the poverty line, including 33.70% of those under age 18 and 25.30% of those age 65 or over.

According to the New York Times, by 2017, the rural Black Belt (called that for its soil) that stretches across the middle of the state is home to largely poor counties that are predominantly African-American. These counties include Dallas, Lowndes, Marengo and Perry."

Education
For the 2014-15 school year, the Marengo County School District is operating three K–12 schools, one each in Dixons Mills, Sweet Water. and Thomaston.  One former county school in the Demopolis area was closed by the school board following the 2013-14 school year.  Demopolis and Linden have city-run school systems, the Demopolis City School District and Linden City Schools.

Culture

Events
Candlelight Evening at Gaineswood, part of Christmas in the Canebrake, in Demopolis
Christmas on the River in Demopolis
Faunsdale Biker Rally in Faunsdale
Alabama Crawfish Festival in Faunsdale
Harvest Festival in Demopolis
Historic Demopolis Spring Pilgrimage in Demopolis
Pepper Jelly Festival in Thomaston
Southern Literary Trail in Demopolis

Places of interest
Marengo County is home to the Alabama Rural Heritage Center and Chickasaw State Park. The Tombigbee River and Black Warrior River form portions of the western and northern county borders and provide recreational opportunities. Marengo County has 28 sites listed on the National Register of Historic Places, one of which is also a National Historic Landmark.  Additionally, 19 sites are listed on the Alabama Register of Landmarks and Heritage.

Government
Like the rest of the Black Belt, Marengo County leans Democratic. However, it often produces narrow margins for winning candidates; no presidential candidate has won more than 54% of the vote in Marengo since Richard Nixon in 1972. In 2020, Donald Trump lost the county by only 105 votes.

Communities

Cities
Demopolis
Linden (county seat)

Towns
Dayton
Faunsdale
Myrtlewood
Providence
Sweet Water
Thomaston

Census-designated places
Nanafalia
Putnam

Unincorporated communities

Aimwell
Alfalfa
Beaver Creek
Clayhill
Consul
Coxheath
Dixons Mills
Exmoor
Half Acre
Half Chance
Hampden
Hoboken
Hugo
Jefferson
Lasca
McKinley
Magnolia
Marengo
Moores Valley
Moscow
Nicholsville
Octagon
Old Spring Hill
Pin Hook
Pope
Rembert
Salt Well
Shiloh
Siddonsville
Surginer
Vangale
Vineland
Wayne

Ghost town
Aigleville

See also
National Register of Historic Places listings in Marengo County, Alabama
Properties on the Alabama Register of Landmarks and Heritage in Marengo County, Alabama

References

 
1818 establishments in Alabama Territory
Populated places established in 1818
Black Belt (U.S. region)
French-American culture in Alabama
Majority-minority counties in Alabama